The American Ballet was the first professional ballet company George Balanchine created in the United States. The company was founded with the help of Lincoln Kirstein and Edward Warburg, managed by Alexander Merovitch and populated by students of Kirstein and Balanchine's School of American Ballet. Having failed to mount a tour, American Ballet began performing at the Old Met. After being allowed to stage only two dance performances (Orfeo ed Euridice) in 1936 and an evening of dances choreographed to the music of Igor Stravinsky in 1937), Balanchine moved the company to Hollywood in 1938. The company was restarted as the American Ballet Caravan and toured North and South America, although it too folded after several years.

See also
New York City Ballet

Footnotes

External links 

 Sunday NY Times, June 10, 1934
 NY Times, June 11, 1934
 Sunday NY Times, November 4, 1934
 NY Times, February 7, 1935
 NY Times, February 22, 1935
 Sunday NY Times, John Martin, February 24, 1935
 NY Times, August 8, 1935
 NY Times, August 13, 1935
 NY Times, August 20, 1935
 Sunday NY Times, letter to the editor from Lincoln Kirstein, August 25, 1935
 Sunday NY Times review of benefit for the Westchester County Girl Scouts at County Centre, September 29, 1935
 "Balanchine Out of Opera; Ballet Will Go With Him; Master of Troupe Criticizes Metropolitan's Standards—Says Dowagers Did Not Like His Dances as They Were 'Too Good' Balanchine Quits with Opera Ballet" by H. Howard Taubman, The New York Times, April 13, 1938

Ballet companies in the United States
New York City Ballet
1936 establishments in New York City
Performing groups established in 1936